The first season of the fantasy comedy television series The Good Place,  created by Michael Schur, aired between September 19, 2016, and January 19, 2017, on NBC in the United States. The season was produced by Fremulon, 3 Arts Entertainment, and Universal Television.

The series focuses on Eleanor Shellstrop (Kristen Bell), a recently deceased young woman who wakes up in the afterlife and is welcomed by Michael (Ted Danson) to "the Good Place," a heaven-like utopia he designed, in reward for her righteous life. Eleanor realizes that she was sent there by mistake, and hides her morally imperfect behavior (past and present). William Jackson Harper, Jameela Jamil, and Manny Jacinto co-star as other residents of the Good Place, together with D'Arcy Carden as an artificial being helping the inhabitants. Each of the episodes are listed as "Chapter (xx)" following the opening title sequence.

Cast

Main

 Kristen Bell as Eleanor Shellstrop, a deceased, selfish saleswoman from Phoenix, Arizona who winds up in the Good Place by mistake. In order to earn her spot, she recruits Chidi to teach her the fundamentals of becoming a better person.
 William Jackson Harper as Chidi Anagonye, a deceased Nigerian-born Senegalese professor of ethics and moral philosophy. Chidi is assigned as Eleanor's soulmate in Michael's first Good Place experiment, and he gives her ethics lessons in an attempt to make her a better person.
 Jameela Jamil as Tahani Al-Jamil, a deceased, wealthy English philanthropist who believes she belongs in the Good Place. She forms an unlikely friendship with Eleanor, who initially dislikes her positive attitude, condescending way of speaking, and tendency to name drop.
 D'Arcy Carden as Janet, a programmed guide and knowledge bank who acts as the Good Place's main source of information and can provide its residents with whatever they desire.
 Carden also plays Bad Janet, a disrespectful version of Janet designed not to respond to residents properly.
 Manny Jacinto as Jason Mendoza, a deceased amateur DJ and drug dealer from Jacksonville, Florida who winds up in the Good Place by mistake. He is introduced as Jianyu Li, a Taiwanese monk who took a vow of silence. Later, Jason proves to be an immature and unintelligent, but kindhearted Jacksonville Jaguars and Blake Bortles fan. 
 Ted Danson as Michael, the architect who runs the Good Place neighborhood in which Eleanor, Chidi, Tahani, and Jason reside. Michael has a deep affinity for the mundane aspects of human life, like playing with paper clips or searching for one's car keys. "Michael" is a Hebrew name meaning "who is like God?"

Recurring
 Tiya Sircar as the "real Eleanor Shellstrop", a human rights lawyer mistakenly sent to the Bad Place in Eleanor's stead.
 Adam Scott as Trevor, a cruel demon from the Bad Place who bullies the main group.
 Marc Evan Jackson as Shawn, Michael's boss, introduced as an all powerful judge who is called in to help decide Eleanor's fate. 
 Maribeth Monroe as Mindy St. Claire, a deceased corporate lawyer and cocaine addict who just barely toed the line of earning enough Good Place points before her death and thus was awarded her own private Medium Place.
 Eugene Cordero as Pillboi, Jason's best friend and partner in crime.
 Rebecca Hazlewood as Kamilah Al-Jamil, Tahani's massively successful and competitive younger sister.
 Ajay Mehta as Waqas Al-Jamil, Tahani's father.
 Anna Khaja as Manisha Al-Jamil, Tahani's mother.
 Josh Siegal as Glen, a bad place demon who acts as a Good Place resident. Siegal is a writer on the show and stepped into the part initially in the first season when the original actor was unable to secure a travel visa.

Guest
 Leslie Grossman as Donna Shellstrop, Eleanor's mother.
 Tom Beyer as  Doug Shellstrop, Eleanor's father.

Episodes

Critical reception
The first season of The Good Place received positive reviews from television critics. On Rotten Tomatoes, the first season has a rating of 92%, based on 71 reviews, with an average rating of 7.74/10. The site's critical consensus reads, "Kristen Bell and Ted Danson knock it out of the park with supremely entertaining, charming performances in this absurd, clever and whimsical portrayal of the afterlife." On Metacritic, the first season has a score of 78 out of 100, based on reviews from 32 critics, indicating "generally favorable reviews."

Critics' top 10 lists

Ratings

Notes

References

External links
 
 

2016 American television seasons
2017 American television seasons
The Good Place seasons